Clinopodium grandiflorum, the large-flowered calamint, showy calamint or mint savory, is a species of ornamental plant.

Distribution
It grows in certain mountains of western and southern Europe (Massif Central, Alps, Pyrénées,...) above 700 meters high. It can be found in beech forests.

Use
It can be used in cooking, and in herbal medicine for bruises and cramps.. In the Aubrac region of France, it is used as an infusion and called "thé d'Aubrac" (Aubrac tea); it is appreciated for its digestive properties.

References

External links
Calamintha grandiflora
Calamintha grandiflora

grandiflorum